Guy Street (officially in ) is a north-south street located in downtown Montreal, Quebec, Canada. Concordia University's Integrated Engineering, Computer Science and Visual Arts Complex is located on this street, as is the John Molson School of Business building. The street is home to the Guy-Concordia Metro station. Guy Street runs through the Little Burgundy and Shaughnessy Village neighbourhoods, and the recently named Quartier Concordia district, before changing to Côte-des-Neiges Road, above Sherbrooke Street.

History
The street was named on August 30, 1817 for Étienne Guy (1774-1820), a notary and member for the riding of Montreal in the Lower Canada Assembly. He gave the city the land for the street. Guy Street constituted the link between the Faubourg Saint-Joseph and Saint-Antoine.

Since 1869, the Grey Nuns have had a convent on Guy Street, at the corner of Dorchester Boulevard. The Grey Nuns' Motherhouse was purchased by Concordia University in 2007.

From 1898 to 1963, the street was home to Her Majesty's Theatre, a key performing arts venue.

See also 

 165 Côte-des-Neiges
 166 Queen Mary
 Structure gauge

References

Streets in Montreal
Downtown Montreal